The blue-spotted hawker (Adversaeschna brevistyla) is the only known species of dragonfly of the genus Adversaeschna in the family Aeshnidae.

Description
The blue-spotted hawker is a large dragonfly with a pair of pale stripes on either side of the thorax. Mature males have blue eyes whilst females have brown eyes.

Distribution and habitat
The blue-spotted hawker is widespread across Australia, New Zealand, Norfolk Island and some Pacific Islands. Its presence has not been verified in the Northern Territory.

It may be found near ponds and marshes as well as vegetation far from water. It prefers still water but may also be found along calm streams.

Gallery

References

Aeshnidae
Insects of Australia
Insects described in 1842